Augusto Vieira de Oliveira (4 June 1930 – 26 August 2004), commonly known as Tite, was a Brazilian footballer who played as a left winger.

Tite had his playing career mainly associated with Santos, being a part of the Os Santásticos team.

Club career
Born in Campos dos Goytacazes, Rio de Janeiro, Tite began his career with the amateur sides of hometown club Goytacaz. In 1947 he moved to Fluminense, but after seeing little chances of playing in the first team due to the presence of Telê Santana, he joined Santos in 1951.

After making his debut at the club in May 1951, Tite became a regular starter for Peixe before the breakthrough of Pepe, who played in the same position. He signed with Corinthians in 1958, but returned to Santos in 1960, being a part of the Os Santásticos team and winning several trophies before his retirement in 1963.

International career
Tite played three matches for the Brazil national football team in 1957, scoring the winner on his debut on 11 June, in a 2–1 friendly win over Portugal at the Maracanã Stadium.

Death
Tite died on 26 August 2004, aged 74, after struggling with lung cancer.

Career statistics

International

Honours
Santos
Campeonato Paulista: 1955, 1956, 1960, 1961, 1962
Torneio Rio – São Paulo: 1959, 1963
Taça Brasil: 1961, 1962, 1963
Copa Libertadores: 1962, 1963
Intercontinental Cup: 1962, 1963

References

1930 births
2004 deaths
People from Campos dos Goytacazes
Brazilian footballers
Association football wingers
Fluminense FC players
Santos FC players
Sport Club Corinthians Paulista players
Brazil international footballers
Deaths from lung cancer in Brazil
Sportspeople from Rio de Janeiro (state)